George W. Lively became mayor of Houston, Texas, in 1839. He was a member of the German Society.

Lively served an expired term as mayor after the resignation of Francis W. Moore, Jr. During his brief tenure, Lively  expanded regulation of public health, especially regulation of the meat market. He also led an effort to improve transportation with new bridges.

References

Mayors of Houston
Republic of Texas politicians